Totally Hair Barbie (also known as Ultra Hair Barbie in Europe) is a fashion doll in the Barbie line that was released in 1992. The doll's extra-long hair reached all the way to her toes and at the time, she had the longest hair ever for a Barbie doll. She is notable for being the highest selling Barbie doll in history.

Product and History
The doll debuted in 1992 with several versions available: standard blonde Barbie, a brunette Barbie (which was significant because it was the first time in 20 years that a brunette Barbie was produced), African American Barbie, Totally Hair Ken, Totally Hair Skipper, Totally Hair Courtney, and a Totally Hair Whitney. Accessories included a scrunchie, hair clips, hair tie, comb, DEP styling Hair gel, the dress, and her signature pink heels. Fashion packs were also released alongside the dolls to redress them. A Totally Hair Barbie Styling Head was also released. The doll was marketed at the time as being the longest haired Barbie, until she was dethroned by Jewel Hair Mermaid Barbie in 1996.

More than ten million Totally Hair Barbie dolls were sold worldwide, making Totally Hair Barbie the best-selling Barbie doll in Mattel's history. Totally Hair Barbie was a hit with children between 1992 and around 1995, holding a record for the world's longest successful toy sale, being on the market for about 4 years.

In 2017, Mattel rereleased the doll for her 25th anniversary, and it is generally faithful to the original, with some minor changes, such as a lack of the hair gel and the inclusion of a booklet, certificate of authenticity, a doll stand, and the hair being a different material, as the original had Kanekalon hair while the reproduction has Saran hair. This version was marketed towards adult collectors. Her hair being made of a different material compared to the original was what resulted in the exclusion of the hair gel.

References

Barbie